Shawnta Darnell Rogers (born January 5, 1976) is an American former professional basketball player and former star at The George Washington University of the Atlantic 10 Conference. He attended Lake Clifton High School in Baltimore, Maryland, where he was born. A 5' 4" (1.63 m) point guard, Rogers was named the Atlantic 10 Player of the Year in 1999. He also won the Frances Pomeroy Naismith Award, for the best NCAA player under 6 feet, in 1999. He also led men's college basketball in steals that year. In 2011, Rogers was named to GW's Athletics Hall of Fame.

After college

Rogers was selected by the Rockford Lightning in the 6th round (#47 pick overall) of 1999 CBA Draft.

Rogers began his pro career with the Baltimore Bayrunners of the IBL for the 99-00 season, then played for many successful European teams. He played at Le Mans Sarthe Basket in the Ligue Nationale de Basketball Pro A, the top league in France, from 2000–03, where he was an All-Star twice. He then moved to ASVEL Lyon-Villeurbanne (Pro A) in 2003-04, Pallacanestro Cantù in Italy in 2004-2005, Basket Draghi Novara also in Italy in 2005-06, Dexia Mons-Hainaut in Belgium and again Le Mans in 2006-07, and ÉS Chalon-sur-Saône (Pro A) in 2007-2008. In 2008-2009 he played for Hyeres-Toulon in France, and in 2009-2010 for SPO Rouen Basket, also in France.

He appeared multiple times in the ULEB Cup and the Euroleague.

Career stats at George Washington
 1995-96: 10.5 ppg, 4.7 rpg, 6.5 apg, 2.0 spg
 1996-97: 12.9 ppg, 5.7 rpg, 4.4 apg, 2.8 spg
 1997-98: 14.9 ppg, 4.4 rpg, 4.8 apg, 2.4 spg
 1998-99: 20.7 ppg, 4.0 rpg, 6.8 apg, 3.6 spg

See also
 List of NCAA Division I men's basketball season steals leaders

External links
LNB profile (French)
SI.com Profile
BasketStats.info Profile

References

1976 births
Living people
American expatriate basketball people in Belgium
American expatriate basketball people in France
American expatriate basketball people in Italy
ASVEL Basket players
Baltimore Bayrunners players
Basketball players from Baltimore
Élan Chalon players
George Washington Colonials men's basketball players
HTV Basket players
Le Mans Sarthe Basket players
Pallacanestro Cantù players
Point guards
American men's basketball players